Itabuna Esporte Clube, commonly known as Itabuna, is a Brazilian football team based in Itabuna, Bahia state. They competed in the Série A twice.

History
The club was founded on May 23, 1967. Itabuna competed in the Série A in 1978, when they reached the Second Stage of the competition, and in 1979, when they were eliminated in the First Stage of the competition. They won the Campeonato Baiano Second Level in 2002 and 2022.

Achievements

 Campeonato Baiano Second Level:
 Winners (2): 2002 and 2022

Stadium
Itabuna Esporte Clube play their home games at Estádio Luiz Viana Filho, nicknamed Itabunão. The stadium has a maximum capacity of 11,745 people.

References

External links
 Official website

Association football clubs established in 1967
Football clubs in Bahia
1967 establishments in Brazil